For Real Tho' is the sixth studio album by the American contemporary R&B group LeVert, released in 1993 via Atlantic Records. It peaked at #35 on the Billboard 200 and #5 on the Billboard R&B chart.

Three singles were released from the album: "Good Ol' Days", "ABC-123" and "Do the Thangs". "ABC-123" was the most successful single from the album, peaking at #46 on the Billboard Hot 100 in 1993.

The album was certified gold by the RIAA on June 9, 1993.

Production
The album was produced by Gerald Levert and Marc Gordon.  Gordon began working on For Real Tho''' while Gerald was promoting his 1991 solo album.

Critical receptionThe Baltimore Sun wrote that "Gerald Levert's lead vocals don't just underscore the music's emotional content; they also reinforce the rhythm." The Washington Post thought that "Gerald is singing better than ever, which is one of the reasons why the trio's latest album ... ranks among its best." USA Today'' wrote that "Gerald's rugged baritone is sounding more like his dad's every day."

Track listing

Chart positions

Samples

References

External links
 

1993 albums
Albums produced by Gerald Levert
Atlantic Records albums
LeVert albums